{{Infobox television
| image                =
| caption              = 
| alt_name             = 
| genre                = Telenovela
| creator              = Ibsen Martínez and Salvador Garmendia
| developer            = 
| writer               = Ibsen Martínez Salvador Garmendia
| director             = Gabriel Walfenzao
| creative_director    = 
| presenter            = 
| starring             = Maricarmen RegueiroFlavio CaballeroCarlos MárquezCarolina LopezErnesto Balzi
| voices               = 
| narrated             = 
| theme_music_composer = 
| opentheme            = Como tempestad by Grupo Urbanda
| endtheme             = 
| composer             = 
| country              = Venezuela
| language             = Spanish
| num_seasons          = 
| num_episodes         = 167
| list_episodes        = 
| executive_producer   = Maria Auxiliadora Barrios
| producer             = Raul Licausi
| editor               = 
| location             = 
| cinematography       = 
| camera               = 
| runtime              = 
| company              = Radio Caracas Televisión
| channel              = Radio Caracas Televisión
| picture_format       = 
| audio_format         =
| first_aired          = 
| last_aired           = 
| related              = La Doña (1972)Doménica Montero (1978)El desafío (1995) 
}}Amanda Sabater is a Venezuelan telenovela written by Ibsen Martínez and Salvador Garmendia and produced by Radio Caracas Televisión in 1989. The telenovela is inspired by the Mexican version Doménica Montero'' written by Cuban writer Inés Rodena. This telenovela lasted 167 episodes and was distributed internationally by RCTV International.

Maricarmen Regueiro and Flavio Caballero starred as the main protagonists with Elisa Stella and Gabriel Fernández as the main antagonists.

Synopsis
The beautiful city of Rio Grande belongs to the wealthy landowner Gregorio Sabater. His daughter, Amanda Sabater, is deeply in love with Arsenio Cuevas, and they are engaged to be married. Amanda knows only her father's "good side" and is unaware of his insidious activities. And her love for Arsenio has blinded her to the truth that her cousin Ana Belen is his lover. Ivan Moros, born in Rio Grande, left the city when he was a child. He returns and changes the lives of everyone. When Amanda meets Ivan she is strangely attracted to him, but only after a terrible turn of events does she come to know Ivan as her true love. In preparing for the wedding of Amanda and Arsenio, her father draws up a legal contract that waives Arsenio's rights to Amanda's wealth. Although Arsenio signs the document, he later abandons Amanda at the altar on their wedding day. Amanda is deeply hurt by Arsenio's rejection. She suffers an emotional breakdown and assumes a completely different personality. A series of shattering events and high passions shake the Sabater's city. Ivan Moros loves Amanda so much that he endures the scorn she feels for him - as he fights to win her love.

Cast

References

External links
Amanda Sabater at the Internet Movie Database
Opening credits

1989 telenovelas
RCTV telenovelas
Venezuelan telenovelas
1989 Venezuelan television series debuts
1989 Venezuelan television series endings
Spanish-language telenovelas
Television shows set in Venezuela